The following is a list of nicknames of non-FIFA and former national association football teams.

Nicknames

Non-FIFA teams

ConIFA teams 

 Nicknames in italics are commonly used in English.

Other non-FIFA teams 

 Nicknames in italics are commonly used in English.

Former teams 

 Translations in italics indicate nicknames also used in English.

See also 

 List of national association football teams by nickname

References 

Nickname non-FIFA and former
National non-FIFA and former